Ernest Harvey (14 December 1880 – 19 October 1923) was an Australian cricketer.

Harvey was born in Redfern, Sydney, Australia. He died in Perth, Australia, aged 43. He played for Western Australia cricket team.

See also
 List of Western Australia first-class cricketers

References

Australian cricketers
1880 births
1923 deaths
Western Australia cricketers
Cricketers from Sydney